Garret Molloy (birth unknown) is an Irish former professional rugby league footballer who played in the 1990s. He played at representative level for Ireland, and at club level for Dublin Blues.

International honours
Garret Molloy won a cap for Ireland while at Dublin Blues 1999 1-cap (sub).

References

Living people
Ireland national rugby league team players
Irish rugby league players
Place of birth missing (living people)
Rugby league players from County Dublin
Year of birth missing (living people)